Dead Kids is a Filipino thriller film directed by Mikhail Red and starring Kelvin Miranda, Vance Larena, Sue Ramirez, Khalil Ramos, Jan Silverio, Gabby Padilla, and Markus Paterson. Dead Kids was released on December 1, 2019, on Netflix.

Premise
In an exclusive private school, a group of teenagers scheme to kidnap their rich classmate and hold him hostage. The situation escalates beyond their control as the plan goes awry for everyone involved.

Cast
 Kelvin Miranda as Mark Santa Maria
 Vance Larena as Charles Blanco
 Khalil Ramos as Paolo Gabriel
 Jan Silverio as Gideon Uy
 Markus Paterson as Chuck Santos
 Sue Ramirez as Janina Camiloza
 Gabby Padilla as Yssa Miranda
 Ku Aquino as Uncle Rody
 Allan Villafuerte as Manolo
 Rowena Concepcion as Auntie Bebe
 Emmanuel Dela Cruz as Theater Teacher
 Juan Pablo Pineda III as Moses
 Jude Matthew Servilla as Peter

Release
Dead Kids premiered on the closing ceremony of the 2019 Cinema One Originals Film Festival. It was released on December 1, 2019, on streaming site Netflix.

Reception

Critical reception
Dead Kids received positive response from critics and audiences. Fred Hawson of ABS-CBN News said “the suspense and tension of the final outcome will keep viewers hanging on to the very end.” He also praised the acting, though he criticized Sue Ramirez’ character as “largely sidelined and undeveloped.“  Jocelyn Valle of Philippine Entertainment Portal praised the cast and said that the film is a worthy addition to your “My List” in Netflix.

References

External links
 
 

2019 films
Filipino-language films
Filipino-language Netflix original films
Films directed by Mikhail Red